Soldier of Fortune is the eighth studio album by Japanese heavy metal band Loudness, and their first with American vocalist Mike Vescera. It is the band's third album produced by Max Norman after Thunder in the East in 1985 and Lightning Strikes in 1986. The album is co-produced by Fates Warning's producer Roger Probert. Despite the good critical reception and the strong support given by the label, the album failed to chart in the US. The CD contains heavy and fast tracks like "Soldier of Fortune", "You Shook Me", "Red Light Shooter", "Running for Cover", "Faces in the Fire" and "Demon Disease".

A music video for the song "You Shook Me" was made, where the band can be affected by playing at the foot of the famous Hollywood peak, which falls apart specifically before the same sound force.

Track listing 
All music by Akira Takasaki. Lyrics are credited to Loudness.

"Soldier of Fortune" – 3:55
"You Shook Me" – 4:42
"Danger of Love" – 5:02
"Twenty Five Days from Home" – 4:22
"Red Light Shooter" – 4:50
"Running for Cover" – 4:21
"Lost Without Your Love" – 4:56
"Faces in the Fire" – 4:08
"Long After Midnight" – 4:38
"Demon Disease" – 4:34

Personnel 
Loudness
Michael Vescera – vocals
Akira Takasaki – guitars
Masayoshi Yamashita – bass
Munetaka Higuchi – drums

Additional musicians
Claude Schnell – keyboards

Production
Max Norman – producer, mixing
Roger Probert – producer
Bill Freesh – engineer
Charlie Brocco, Steve Sisco, Dave Carpenter, Joe Barresi, Pat MacDougall, Masanori Ihara – assistant engineers
Chris Bellman – mastering

References 

1989 albums
Loudness (band) albums
Albums produced by Max Norman
Atco Records albums
Warner Music Japan albums